In 1967–68, centre forward George Yardley starred as Tranmere Rovers F.C. reached the FA Cup fifth round. Newly promoted Tranmere lost their first three games and future England star Roy McFarland was sold to Derby County. Results improved with Yardley scoring four goals in a 4–1 win over Shrewsbury, then scoring hat-tricks against Colchester United and Swindon Town. George Hudson also scored a hat-trick in Tranmere's 5–1 win over Rochdale in the FA Cup first round; the team went on to beat Bradford Park Avenue 3–2, Huddersfield Town 2–1 and Coventry City 2–0, before losing 2–0 to Everton in a fifth round tie watched by 61,982 at Goodison Park.

Final league table

References 

 

 

Tranmere Rovers F.C. seasons
Tranmere Rovers